Kurlovich is a gender-neutral Slavic surname that may refer to:

 Aleksandr Kurlovich (born 1961), Belarusian weightlifter
 Boguslav Kurlovich (born 1948), Russian-Finnish scientific agronomist
 Vadim Kurlovich (born 1992), Belarusian football player

See also

Karlovich